Old Dailly is a hamlet in South Ayrshire, Scotland. It is located west of Dailly (or "New Dailly"). 

The Charter or Blue stones of Old Dailly in Ayrshire are 
located in the cemetery of Old Dailly church.

The local folklore legend known as "The Charles" is also said to visit the town

References

External links
Video of the Old Dailly Blue Stones
Video footage of Old Dailly Kirk

Villages in Carrick, Scotland